Świerklany Górne is a village in the administrative district of Gmina Świerklany, within Rybnik County, Silesian Voivodeship, in southern Poland.

The village has a population of 3,900.

The village was first mentioned in a Latin document of Diocese of Wrocław called Liber fundationis episcopatus Vratislaviensis from around 1305 as item in Swrklant debent esse XXIII) mansi.

References

Villages in Rybnik County